Crisilla is a genus of minute sea snails, marine gastropod mollusks or micromollusks in the family Rissoidae.

Species
Species within the genus Crisilla include:
 Crisilla aartseni (Verduin, 1984)
 Crisilla alvarezi Templado & Rolán, 1994
 Crisilla amphiglypha Bouchet & Warén, 1993
 Crisilla angustostriata Van der Linden, 2005
 Crisilla basteriae (Moolenbeek & Faber, 1986)
 Crisilla beniamina (Monterosato, 1884)
 Crisilla callosa (Manzoni, 1868)
 Crisilla chiarellii (Cecalupo & Quadri, 1995)
 Crisilla cristallinula (Manzoni, 1868)
 Crisilla depicta (Manzoni, 1868)
 Crisilla fallax Gofas, 1999
 Crisilla gagliniae (Amati, 1985)
 Crisilla galvagni (Aradas & Maggiore, 1844)
 Crisilla graxai Templado & Rolán, 1994
 Crisilla innominata (Watson, 1897)
 Crisilla iunoniae (Palazzi, 1988)
 Crisilla luquei Templado & Rolán, 1994
 Crisilla maculata (Monterosato, 1869)
 Crisilla marioni Fasulo & Gaglini, 1987
 Crisilla morenoi Templado & Rolán, 1994
 Crisilla orteai Templado & Rolán, 1994
 Crisilla ovulum Gofas, 2007
 Crisilla perminima (Manzoni, 1868)
 Crisilla picta (Jeffreys, 1867)
 Crisilla postrema (Gofas, 1990)
 Crisilla quisquiliarum (R. B. Watson, 1886)
 Crisilla ramosorum Oliver, Templado & Kersting, 2012
 Crisilla semistriata (Montagu, 1808)
 Crisilla senegalensis Rolán & Hernández, 2006
 Crisilla spadix (Watson, 1897)
 Crisilla transitoria Gofas, 1999
 Crisilla ugesae (Verduin, 1988)
 Crisilla vidali Templado & Rolán, 1994
Species brought into synonymy
 Crisilla lincta (Watson, 1873): synonym of Onoba lincta (Watson, 1873)
 Crisilla pseudocingulata (Nordsieck, 1972): synonym of Crisilla galvagni (Aradas & Maggiore, 1844)
 Crisilla tenera (Philippi, 1844): synonym of Alvania tenera (Philippi, 1844)

References

 Monterosato T. A. (di) (1917). Molluschi viventi e quaternari raccolti lungo le coste della Tripolitania dall'Ing. Camillo Crema. Bollettino Zoologico Italiano Ser. 3, 4: 1-28, pl. 1 (fig. 1-35) page(s): 14
 Nordsieck F. (1972). Die europäischen Meeresschnecken (Opisthobranchia mit Pyramidellidae; Rissoacea). Vom Eismeer bis Kapverden, Mittelmeer und Schwarzes Meer. Gustav Fischer, Stuttgart XIII + 327 pp
 Bouchet P. & Warén A. (1993). Revision of the Northeast Atlantic bathyal and abyssal Mesogastropoda. Bollettino Malacologico supplemento 3: 579-840
 Gofas, S.; Le Renard, J.; Bouchet, P. (2001). Mollusca. in: Costello, M.J. et al. (eds), European Register of Marine Species: a check-list of the marine species in Europe and a bibliography of guides to their identification. Patrimoines Naturels. 50: 180-213
 Rolán E., 2005. Malacological Fauna From The Cape Verde Archipelago. Part 1, Polyplacophora and Gastropoda.

Rissoidae
Gastropod genera